Pirottaea is a genus of fungi in the family Dermateaceae. The genus contained 26 species in 2009. It went up to about 48 species later.

The genus name of Pirottaea is in honour of Pietro Romualdo Pirotta (1853–1936), who was an Italian professor of botany. He was made Knight of the Crown of Italy. 

The genus was circumscribed by Pier Andrea Saccardo in Michelia vl.1 (Issue 4) on page 424 in 1878.

Species
As accepted by Species Fungorum;

 Pirottaea absinthiicola 
 Pirottaea aconiti 
 Pirottaea adenostylidis 
 Pirottaea astragali 
 Pirottaea aterrima 
 Pirottaea atrofusca 
 Pirottaea bavarica 
 Pirottaea bresadolae 
 Pirottaea brevipila 
 Pirottaea bromeliacearum 
 Pirottaea caesiella 
 Pirottaea corvina 
 Pirottaea dubia 
 Pirottaea exilispora 
 Pirottaea falcata 
 Pirottaea fraxini 
 Pirottaea frondicola 
 Pirottaea gallica 
 Pirottaea geraniicola 
 Pirottaea glaucoviridis 
 Pirottaea helvetica 
 Pirottaea hydrangeae 
 Pirottaea imbricata 
 Pirottaea inopinata 
 Pirottaea intercedens 
 Pirottaea lamii 
 Pirottaea longipila 
 Pirottaea lychnidis 
 Pirottaea malvae 
 Pirottaea microspora 
 Pirottaea mimatensis 
 Pirottaea nigrostriata 
 Pirottaea paupercula 
 Pirottaea persica 
 Pirottaea pilosissima 
 Pirottaea plantaginis 
 Pirottaea saxonica 
 Pirottaea scabiosicola 
 Pirottaea scruposa 
 Pirottaea senecionis 
 Pirottaea strigosa 
 Pirottaea symphyti 
 Pirottaea tentaculata 
 Pirottaea trichostoma 
 Pirottaea uliginosa 
 Pirottaea veneta 
 Pirottaea versicolor 
 Pirottaea yakutatiana

See also
 List of Dermateaceae genera

References

External links

Dermateaceae genera